Applied Microbiology International, formally known as the Society for Applied Microbiology (SfAM), is the oldest microbiology society in the UK founded in 1931. Its object is to advance for the benefit of the public the science of microbiology in its application to the environment, human and animal health, agriculture and industry.  Applied Microbiology International is an active member of the Royal Society of Biology, and the Federation of European Microbiological Societies. The Society's current president is Professor Brendan Gilmore.

Publications
The society is responsible for the publication of five academic journals:
 Journal of Applied Microbiology
 Letters in Applied Microbiology
 Environmental Microbiology
 Environmental Microbiology Reports
 Microbial Biotechnology

The Society also publishes the quarterly magazine Microbiologist.

Events
Applied Microbiology International holds a number of scientific meetings every year including its Early Career Scientist Research Symposium and two lecture evenings which celebrate the success of the journals Environmental Microbiology and the Journal of Applied Microbiology.

Membership
Applied Microbiology International is based in the United Kingdom and has members from all over the world. There are several membership levels enabling anyone with an interest in microbiology become eligible for membership.

Grants and awards
The Society has an extensive range of grants and awards available to all Members.

W H Pierce Prize 
This award was instituted in 1984 to commemorate the life and works of the late W H (Bill) Pierce, former Chief Bacteriologist of Oxo Ltd. and a long time member of the Society. This prestigious prize is awarded each year at the Annual Applied Microbiology Conference to a young microbiologist who has made a substantial contribution to the science of applied microbiology. Application is by nomination by Members of the Society only.

See also
American Society for Microbiology
Federation of European Microbiological Societies
Royal Society of Biology

References

External links
 SfAM website
 Microbiologist Magazine

Applied microbiology
Biology organisations based in the United Kingdom
Microbiology organizations
Scientific organizations established in 1931